Douglas Bryan Hughes (born July 21, 1969) is an American attorney and politician who is a Republican member of the Texas State Senate for District 1. He was first elected to the Texas Senate in November 2016. Previously, Hughes was a member of the Texas House of Representatives from 2003 through January 2017 as state representative for District 5, which includes Camp, Harrison, Upshur, and Wood counties in northeastern Texas.

Background
Hughes was born in Quitman and raised in nearby Mineola. After graduating from Mineola High School in 1987, he enrolled at Tyler Junior College. In 1992, he earned his undergraduate degree in economics from the University of Texas at Tyler. In 1995, Hughes received his Juris Doctor degree from Baylor Law School. He clerked for the U.S. District Judge for the Eastern District of Texas, William M. Steger of Texas. In 2003, he joined the Lanier law firm.

Texas legislature

Texas House of Representatives 
Hughes was elected to the Texas House of Representatives in 2002 after running against incumbent Democratic Representative Bob D. Glaze of Gilmer in Upshur County. Hughes polled 20,286 votes (52.4 percent) to Glaze's 18,451 (47.6 percent). In the 2004 general election, Glaze ran against Hughes again but lost, garnering 23,029 votes (38 percent) to the Republican's 37,529 (62 percent). In 2006, no Democrat filed against Hughes and he went on to defeat the Libertarian Timothy J. Carmichael, 26,286 (81.9 percent) to 5,795 (18.1 percent). Hughes was unopposed in the 2010 general election, when Republicans carried 101 of the 150 seats in the state House. In 2011, Hughes was on the House Agriculture and Livestock and Human Services committees.

Hughes was renominated in the Republican primary held on May 29, 2012. He polled 13,015 votes (77.7 percent) to 3,744 (22.4 percent) for his opponent, Mary Lookadoo. No Democrat opposed him the November 6 general election. After his 2012 renomination, Hughes announced that he would attempt to unseat Speaker Straus in 2013. In December, after six months of attempting to line up the necessary commitments, Hughes decided to exit the contest. Representative David Simpson of Longview, who later opposed Hughes in his 2016 state senate race, then entered the contest for Speaker with Hughes' support. However, Simpson also withdrew before the balloting for Speaker began, and Straus was re-elected without opposition on January 8, 2013. Joe Straus also retained the speakership in 2016 with significant support.

Texas Senate
When Kevin Eltife announced his retirement from the state Senate, Hughes entered the Republican primary to succeed Eltife. Hughes carried the backing of Lieutenant Governor Dan Patrick, the presiding officer of the state senate. In the primary, Hughes won a plurality of the vote (48 percent), but fell short of a majority in a multi-candidate field. In the runoff election on May 24, 2016, Hughes defeated fellow State Representative David Simpson, 27,348 (69.3 percent) to 12,105 (30.7 percent). He faced no Democratic opponent in the November 8 general election.

Voting Rights
In 2021, Hughes introduced legislation to limit voting rights in Texas. This was part of a broader national effort by Republicans to restrict voting rights in the wake of the 2020 elections. Joe Biden won the 2020 presidential election, but Donald Trump refused to concede and he and his Republican allies made false claims of extensive election fraud. Civil rights and voting rights groups have claimed that the proposed legislation is an attempt to restrict the access to voting of voters of color. One provision would prohibit early voting on Sunday mornings, which was a traditional period of voting for Black churchgoers as part of 'Souls to the Polls' events.

Hughes defended his attempts to roll back voting by mail, arguing that it was prone to fraud; he offered no evidence for his claims and existing studies show fraud to be exceptionally rare. Hughes has inaccurately claimed that Texas has 400 open voter fraud cases; the Texas Attorney General's office had 43 pending voter fraud cases, of which only one was in relation to the 2020 election.

Abortion
On March 11, 2021, Hughes introduced a fetal heartbeat bill entitled the Texas Heartbeat Bill (SB8) into the Texas Senate and state representative Shelby Slawson of Stephenville, Texas introduced a companion bill (HB1515) into the state house. The bill allowed private citizens to sue abortion providers after a fetal heartbeat has been detected. The SB8 version of the bill passed both chambers and was signed into law by Texas Governor Greg Abbott on May 19, 2021. It took effect on September 1, 2021.
The bill does not make an exception for rape, incest, or life of the mother.

Education on civil rights movement 
In 2021, Hughes authored legislation to prevent public schools from requiring that students read writings by prominent civil rights figures, such as Susan B. Anthony, Cesar Chavez, and Martin Luther King Jr., when covering women's suffrage and the civil rights movement in social studies classes.

References

External links
 Official website
 Bryan Hughes at the Texas Tribune

|-

1969 births
Living people
Republican Party members of the Texas House of Representatives
Republican Party Texas state senators
People from Quitman, Texas
People from Marshall, Texas
University of Texas at Tyler alumni
Baylor Law School alumni
Texas lawyers
21st-century American politicians
People from Mineola, Texas